Jorge Luis Fernández Pérez (born 8 March 1959), known as Tubo Fernández, is an Argentine retired footballer who played as a goalkeeper, and later worked as a coach. He played in the Argentine Primera División for Vélez Sarsfield and Ferro Carril Oeste, before moving to Spain in 1989. He played for a number of Spanish clubs, including making 23 La Liga appearances for Cádiz during the 1992–93 season.

Club career

Fernández was born in the Argentine capital Buenos Aires, and began his career with local side Deportivo Español in 1978. Español won the Primera C Metropolitana title in 1979, and Fernández stayed until joining Primera División side Vélez Sarsfield, under legendary coach Alfio Basile, in 1984. He also had loan spells with Club Cipolletti and Ferro Carril Oeste before signing for Banfield in 1989.

Later in 1989, Fernández made the move to Spain, joining Albacete Balompié. He helped Albacete win their 1989–90 Segunda División B group, before moving on to join Real Murcia in 1990. Murcia qualified for the Segunda División promotion playoff in his first season, but were defeated 5–2 on aggregate by Real Zaragoza. Fernández signed for second tier rivals Lleida in 1991, playing every game during his only season with the club. Unusually for a goalkeeper, he took penalties during his time at Lleida, and scored from the spot five times, including a brace in a 4–1 home win over Athletic Bilbao B at Camp d'Esports on 19 April 1992.

That summer, he took the step up to La Liga with newly promoted Cádiz, and was first choice for most of the season as they suffered immediate relegation. He lost his starting place to Yosu during 1993–94, as Cádiz endured a second consecutive relegation. Fernández had an agreement in place to join Badajoz that summer, but the deal fell through as he was contracted hepatitis. Instead, finished off his career in the fourth and fifth tiers with one season each at Águilas, Cartagonova and Olímpico de Totana. He retired in 1997 at the age of 38.

International career

During 1979, Fernández played for the Argentine national under-20 team, coming under the management of 1978 FIFA World Cup winning head coach César Luis Menotti. He was teammates with many future stars of the national team, including Ramón Díaz and Juan Simón.

Coaching career

After his retirement, Fernández worked as a goalkeeping coach in Spain. He returned to his first Spanish club, Albacete Balompié, in 1998, and was their goalkeeping coach until 2001, when he moved to Ciudad de Murcia. After two seasons with Ciudad, he joined Real Murcia as goalkeeping coach, staying until 2006. He made a brief return to coaching in 2009 with Atlético Ciudad, which had replaced Ciudad de Murcia after the latter's relocation to Granada in 2007.

Honours
Deportivo Español
Primera C Metropolitana: 1979

Albacete Balompié
Segunda División B: 1989–90

UE Lleida
Copa Catalunya runners-up: 1991–92

Águilas
Tercera División runners-up: 1994–95

Cartagonova
Preferente Autonómica de la Región de Murcia runners-up: 1995–96

Career statistics

1. Appearances in the 1990–91 Segunda División promotion playoff

References

External links

Ficha Tubo Fernández at cadistas1910.com 

Tubo Fernández official website

1959 births
Living people
Footballers from Buenos Aires
Argentine footballers
Association football goalkeepers
Primera C Metropolitana players
Primera B Metropolitana players
Primera Nacional players
Argentine Primera División players
Deportivo Español footballers
Club Atlético Vélez Sarsfield footballers
Club Cipolletti footballers
Ferro Carril Oeste footballers
Club Atlético Banfield footballers
Argentine expatriate footballers
Expatriate footballers in Spain
Argentine expatriate sportspeople in Spain
La Liga players
Segunda División players
Segunda División B players
Tercera División players
Divisiones Regionales de Fútbol players
Albacete Balompié players
Real Murcia players
UE Lleida players
Cádiz CF players
Águilas CF players
FC Cartagena footballers
Argentina youth international footballers
Argentina under-20 international footballers
Association football coaches